Schöpp, Schoepp is a surname. People with this surname include:

Andrea Schöpp (born 1965), German female curler, Olympic and World champion
Elinore Schöpp, German female curler
Jie Schöpp (born 1968), Chinese-born, German international table tennis player
Rainer Schöpp (born 1958), German male curler and coach
Trapper Schoepp, American singer-songwriter

See also
Schopp (surname)